(O, You dear Child Jesus), WAB 145, is the first of two motets of Anton Bruckner's St. Florian period, which is of uncertain authorship. If Bruckner was the composer, he composed it presumably in 1845–46.

History 
If Bruckner composed the motet attributed to him, he wrote it presumably in 1845–46 during his stay in St. Florian Abbey. The work was intended for the celebration of Holy Innocents' Day, remembering the Massacre of the Innocents.

The motet was first published in band II/2, p. 13 of the Göllerich/Auer biography. The last two bars, which are on the back of the manuscript together with a transcription of a Christmas carol, were missing in this first publication.

Text

Music 
The work of 16-bar in F major is scored for soloist and organ.

Discography 
 Wilfried Jochens (tenor), Werner Kaufmann (organ), Music of the St. Florian Period (Jürgen Jürgens) - LP: Jerusalem Records ATD 8503, 1984; transferred to CD BSVD-0109, 2011
 Sigrid Hagmüller (alto), Rupert Gottfried Frieberger (organ), Anton Bruckner – Oberösterreichische Kirchenmusik - CD: Fabian Records CD 5112, 1995
 Ludmila Kuznetzova (mezzosoprano), Ludmila Golub (organ), Bruckner: Masses and Songs (Valeri Poliansky) - CD: Chandos CHAN 9863, 1998
 Barbara Schreiner (alto), Rupert Gottfried Frieberger (organ), Anton Bruckner Kirchenmusikalische Werke - CD: Fabian Records CD 5115, c. 2008
 Robert Holzer (Bass), Philipp Sonntag (organ), Anton Bruckner - Lieder|Magnificat - CD: Brucknerhaus LIVA 046, 2011

References

Sources 
 August Göllerich, Anton Bruckner. Ein Lebens- und Schaffens-Bild,  – posthumous edited by Max Auer by G. Bosse, Regensburg, 1932
 Anton Bruckner – Sämtliche Werke, Band XXI: Kleine Kirchenmusikwerke, Musikwissenschaftlicher Verlag der Internationalen Bruckner-Gesellschaft, Hans Bauernfeind and Leopold Nowak (Editor), Vienna, 1984/2001
 Cornelis van Zwol, Anton Bruckner 1824–1896 – Leven en werken, uitg. Thoth, Bussum, Netherlands, 2012.

External links 
 
 O du liebes Jesu Kind F-Dur, WAB 145 Critical discography by Hans Roelofs 

Motets by Anton Bruckner
1845 compositions
Compositions in F major
Bruckner: spurious and doubtful works